Calliotropis hondoensis is a species of sea snail, a marine gastropod mollusk in the family Eucyclidae.

Description

Distribution
This marine species occurs off Japan and the Philippines.

References

 Marshall B. A. (1979). The Trochidae and Turbinidae of the Kermadec Ridge (Mollusca: Gastropoda). New Zealand Journal of Zoology 6: 521–552-page(s): 531
 Vilvens C. (2007) New records and new species of Calliotropis from Indo-Pacific. Novapex 8 (Hors Série 5): 1–72.

External links

hondoensis
Gastropods described in 1919